Pounamuella is a genus of Polynesian araneomorph spiders in the family Orsolobidae, and was first described by Raymond Robert Forster & Norman I. Platnick in 1985.

Species
 it contains eight species, found only in New Zealand:
Pounamuella australis (Forster, 1964) – New Zealand (Auckland Is.)
Pounamuella complexa (Forster, 1956) – New Zealand
Pounamuella hauroko Forster & Platnick, 1985 – New Zealand
Pounamuella hollowayae (Forster, 1956) – New Zealand
Pounamuella insula Forster & Platnick, 1985 – New Zealand
Pounamuella kuscheli Forster & Platnick, 1985 – New Zealand
Pounamuella ramsayi (Forster, 1956) – New Zealand
Pounamuella vulgaris (Forster, 1956) (type) – New Zealand

See also
 List of Orsolobidae species

References

Araneomorphae genera
Orsolobidae
Spiders of New Zealand
Taxa named by Raymond Robert Forster
Endemic spiders of New Zealand